Amadou Diambo (born 12 February 2001) is a Ghanaian football player, who pays as midfielder for Grosseto.

Club career
He was raised in the youth system of Italian club Pescara. He made his Serie B debut for Pescara on 8 March 2020 in a game against Benevento. He substituted Andrea Marafini in the 82nd minute. He made his first start on 20 October 2020 in game against Venezia.

On 1 February 2021 he was loaned to Benevento, where he was assigned to their Under-19 squad. He made his Serie A debut for Benevento on 23 May 2021 in a game against Torino, substituting Giuseppe Di Serio in the 88th minute of a 1–1 away draw.

On summer 2021 he returned to Pescara. Ha has been released by Pescara on 15 July 2022.

References

External links
 

2001 births
Living people
Ghanaian footballers
Association football midfielders
Delfino Pescara 1936 players
Benevento Calcio players
Serie B players
Serie A players
Serie C players
Ghanaian expatriate footballers
Expatriate footballers in Italy